Sean David Reyes is an American lawyer and politician who has been the Attorney General of Utah since 2013. Appointed to the office by Governor Gary Herbert following the resignation of John Swallow, Reyes was subsequently reelected. Reyes is a member of the Republican Party and has served as a county, state, and national delegate for the Republican Party and a member of the Utah Republican Party's State Central Committee.

Early life and education
Reyes was raised in the Los Angeles area. His father was an immigrant from the Philippines and of half-Filipino and half-Spanish descent. His mother was of half-Native Hawaiian and half-Japanese descent. He is a cousin of former Philippine President Ramon Magsaysay.

Reyes earned his bachelor's degree summa cum laude from Brigham Young University in 1994. He graduated from University of California, Berkeley School of Law (Boalt Hall) in 1997.

Early career
Reyes spent 14 years working at Utah's largest law firm, Parsons Behle & Latimer, where he became the first person of color to become a partner. He practiced commercial litigation and employment law. He later became general counsel for eTAGz, a Springville, Utah-based media and technology company that aimed to develop products for embedding digital files on packaging. He was also a partner and co-founder of the venture capital firm Accelerate Ventures, a state small claims court judge, and president of the Minority Bar Association.

Utah Attorney General

Elections
Reyes ran for attorney general of Utah in 2012 against John Swallow. He lost the primary election by a margin of 68 to 32 percent. After Swallow resigned amid scandal in December 2013, Reyes was selected by the Utah Republican Party State Central Committee as one of three candidates to fill the vacancy (on December 14, 2013), and Governor Gary Herbert appointed Reyes to the position (on December 23, 2013).

Because of Utah's election laws, Reyes had to run in the 2014 Utah elections to be elected to finish out the remainder of Swallow's term. He won with 63.06 percent of the vote over his Democratic challenger, Charles A. Stormont, and Libertarian candidate Andrew McCullough.

In 2016, members of the Latter Day Church of Christ, a Mormon fundamentalist denomination, donated to Reyes' campaign for attorney general individually and through Washakie Renewable Energy, a business partially owned by members of the LDCC. Reyes' representatives indicated in response to these reports that the contributions had been placed in escrow.

In 2020, Reyes ran for a third term. He was challenged for the Republican nomination by Utah County Attorney David Leavitt, but won the Republican renomination in the July 2020 primary election with 54.04% of the vote.  In the November 2020 general election, Reyes was reelected, defeating Democratic nominee Greg Skordas.

During the 2020 presidential election, Reyes was an elector. Unable to serve because of COVID-19 self-quarantine, Mia Love was nominated as a replacement elector.

Tenure
As attorney general, Reyes frequently joined other Republican state attorneys general who sued the Obama administration on various issues, ranging from federal lands use to transgender rights.

Immediately after taking office, Reyes appealed U.S. District Judge Robert J. Shelby's ruling that struck down Amendment 3, the state's same-sex marriage ban. The estimated $2 million price tag in appealing Shelby's ruling was criticized by The Advocate, Daily Kos, and ThinkProgress. In response, Reyes stated, "We're willing to spend whatever it takes to protect the laws and the will of the people" and that "everyone benefits from appealing the case." The U.S. Court of Appeals for the Tenth Circuit upheld the district court's ruling; Reyes petitioned the U.S. Supreme Court for review, but the court denied his request to hear the case.

In 2020, after the New York Attorney General sued the National Rifle Association, asserting that Wayne LaPierre and other NRA officials unlawfully misappropriated NRA funds for personal expenses and self-enrichment, Reyes joined Arkansas Attorney General Leslie Rutledge in filing an amicus brief challenging the New York suit. Reyes asserted that the New York AG was discriminating against the NRA.

Trump support
Reyes is a vocal and longtime supporter of Donald Trump. In late-January 2017, Reyes was named as a top candidate for the chairmanship of the Federal Trade Commission by officials in the Trump administration. He praised Trump in a speech at the 2020 Republican National Convention, and Trump endorsed him in his 2020 primary. Reyes was also named Utah state co-chairman of Trump's reelection campaign. In September 2020, during the COVID-19 pandemic, Reyes appeared in the front row of an indoor Trump rally in Nevada, without social distancing from other attendees and without wearing a face mask, garnering criticism.

Unsuccessful attempt to overturn Trump's 2020 election defeat
In November 2020, Reyes took several days leave to go to Nevada in a bid to bolster the Trump campaign's claims of purported voter fraud in neighboring Nevada. Reyes claimed that "voting irregularities" occurred but never provided any evidence for this claim. Nevada Attorney General Aaron Ford noted that there was no evidence of voter fraud in the 2020 Nevada elections, stated that Reyes had not returned his telephone calls or text messages, and termed his conduct "disrespectful" to Nevada. A number of Utah officials, as well as the United Utah Party, criticized Reyes for baselessly undermining faith in the democratic process without evidence.

In December 2020, Reyes joined a group of 16 other Republican state attorneys general in a failed lawsuit to overturn the results of the 2020 presidential election. His participation in the suit was criticized by the outgoing Utah Governor, Gary Herbert, and his successor, Lieutenant Governor and Governor-elect Spencer Cox. Utahns created a petition calling for Reyes's recall. The suit, which attempted to invoke the U.S. Supreme Court's original jurisdiction, was brought by Texas Attorney General Ken Paxton, against Georgia, Michigan, Wisconsin, and Pennsylvania, four swing states in which Joe Biden defeated Trump. The suit repeated Trump's false and disproven claims that the election was marred by widespread voter fraud. Such assertions by Trump and his allies had already been rejected in other state and federal courts. Paxton asked the Supreme Court to invalidate the states' 62 electoral votes, allowing Trump to be declared the winner. Legal experts stated that the suit was meritless. Election law expert Rick Hasen described the lawsuit as "the dumbest case I've ever seen filed on an emergency basis at the Supreme Court." Nebraska Republican Senator Ben Sasse said the situation of Paxton initiating the lawsuit "looks like a fella begging for a pardon filed a PR stunt"; at the time he brought the suit, Paxton was facing a federal securities fraud charge and allegations of abuse of office allegations). On December 11, the U.S. Supreme Court quickly rejected the suit which Reyes had joined, in an unsigned opinion.

Personal life 
Reyes and his wife Saysha have six children.

A member of the Church of Jesus Christ of Latter-day Saints (LDS Church), Reyes was a bishop in Salt Lake City for five years in his early career.

See also 
Asian Americans in politics
Hispanic Americans in politics
Politics of Utah

Electoral history

References

External links
Utah Attorney General's Office website
Campaign website

21st-century American politicians
American jurists of Filipino descent
American politicians of Filipino descent
Brigham Young University alumni
Latter Day Saints from California
Living people
UC Berkeley School of Law alumni
Utah Attorneys General
Utah lawyers
Utah Republicans
Utah state court judges
Asian-American people in Utah politics
Year of birth missing (living people)
Asian conservatism in the United States
21st-century American lawyers